Bewitched is the second album by American alternative rock band Luna.

Track listing
All tracks are by Luna with lyrics by Dean Wareham
 "California (All the Way)" – 4:15
 "Tiger Lily" – 4:46
 "Friendly Advice" – 6:33
 "Bewitched" – 4:45
 "This Time Around" – 3:29
 "Great Jones Street" – 3:36
 "Going Home" – 5:26
 "Into the Fold" – 3:12
 "I Know You Tried" – 3:18
 "Sleeping Pill" – 5:52

Personnel
Luna
 Dean Wareham – vocals, guitars
 Sean Eden – Guitar
 Justin Harwood – bass, vibes and Hammond organ on "Bewitched"
 Stanley Demeski – drums, percussion, vibes on "This Time Around"
with:
 Sterling Morrison – guitar on "Friendly Advice" and "Great Jones Street"
 Grasshopper – clarinet on "Sleeping Pill"
 Frank London – trumpet on "California (All the Way)" and "Bewitched"
 Baumgartner – Hammond organ on "This Time Around" and "Into the Fold"
Technical 
 Victor Van Vugt – producer, engineer
 Jen Monnar – assistant engineer
 Susanne Dyer – assistant engineer
 Mastered by Bob Ludwig

References

1994 albums
Luna (1990s American band) albums
Albums produced by Victor Van Vugt
Elektra Records albums